The 2001 Speedway Grand Prix of Germany was the first race of the 2001 Speedway Grand Prix season. It took place on 5 May in the Friedrich-Ludwig-Jahn-Sportpark in Berlin, Germany

Starting positions draw 
The Speedway Grand Prix Commission nominated Robert Barth and Mirko Wolter as Wild Card. Injured Joe Screen was replaced by Henrik Gustafsson.

Heat details

Standings

See also 
 Speedway Grand Prix
 List of Speedway Grand Prix riders

References

External links 
 FIM-live.com
 SpeedwayWorld.tv

Germany
2001